Thornton Township High School, often simply referred to as Thornton is a public high school founded in 1899, located in Harvey, one of the South Suburbs of the city of Chicago, Illinois, USA. The school is one of three administered by Thornton Township High Schools District 205. It is occasionally confused with the two other similarly named schools in the district, Thornridge High School and Thornwood High School.

A predominantly African American and Hispanic high school, Thornton is best known for its alumni who have been successful in both the Performing Arts and athletics.

History
The site for Thornton Township High School was decided by a special election on May 28, 1898, where Harvey was selected over Dolton by a 1,504 to 1,123 vote, with the estimate of the school's cost being $40,000. Oscar L. Murray was the architect of the building whose cost by October 1898 was $35,000, and was planned that included physical and biological laboratories, a library, gymnasium, a 280-seat assembly room, and bicycle/lunch rooms.

By May 1899, the plans had been firmed up to include a two-story structure with basement, with an interior to be finished in red oak. Heat would be provided by steam, with electric fans and an automated clock and signal system. The main floor assembly room was expanded to seat 700. Construction was set to begin in June, with completion in October. The original building was located at 154th Street and Columbia Avenue.

In 1913, Thornton was one of nine schools, and the only south suburban school, invited to found what became the Suburban League, which mostly consisted of schools like Thornton which had formerly been members of the Cook County High School League.

In 1928, 16-year-old Betty Robinson (between her Junior and Senior years at Thornton) not only won the very first Olympic gold medal awarded to a woman in the 100 meters (at the 1928 Summer Olympics in Amsterdam), but set a world record which stood until 1932.

During World War II, like many high schools, Thornton made changes to accommodate the war effort. Evening classes for adults started in 1942 to begin training people for necessary war jobs. By 1943, the school was open for 87 hours each week, and had been converted almost exclusively to wartime training.<ref>Thornton High School Adapts Studies To War, February 28, 1943, Chicago Daily Tribune, p. SW2;  accessed ProQuest Historical Newspapers Chicago Tribune (1849–1986);  November 26, 2008</ref>

Additions were made to the building in 1912 (costing $140,000), 1927 ($345,000) and 1937 ($300,000).Thornton Board To Rush School Addition Plans, February 7, 1937, Chicago Daily Tribune, p. SW2;  accessed ProQuest Historical Newspapers Chicago Tribune (1849–1986);  November 26, 2008 A third floor was added in 1948. In 1949, a new physical education facility was added, including a natatorium, wrestling rooms, locker facilities and classrooms for health classes, in addition to two gymnasia, one of which could seat 3,500 for basketball games.Thornton Twp High Gymnasium contract Let To Contractor, January 9, 1949, Chicago Daily Tribune, p. SW 11;  accessed ProQuest Historical Newspapers Chicago Tribune (1849–1986);  November 26, 2008 The new gymnasium was dedicated in April 1950.

Athletics
Thornton's sports teams, which are referred to as the Wildcats, compete in the Southland Athletic Conference. The teams also compete in state championship series sponsored by the Illinois High School Association (IHSA). The school colors are purple and white. Teams are stylized as the "Wildcats".

The school sponsors interscholastic athletic teams for boys and girls in basketball, soccer, track and field and cross country. Boys may also compete in baseball, American football, swimming and diving and wrestling. Girls may compete in cheerleading, softball and volleyball.

The following athletic teams have won or placed top four in their respective IHSA sponsored state tournament:

 Basketball (Boys) – State Champions (1932–33, 1965–66); 2nd Place (1933-34, 1934-35, 1960-61, 1994-95, 1995-96); 3rd Place (1982-83, 1996-97, 2008-09); 4th Place (1964-65)
 Football – State Champions (1990–91)
 Wrestling – State Champions (1953–54, 1954–55, 1958–59)

Activities
Thornton is known for its illustrious Speech team. The following groups advanced to the IHSA State Finals competition, sponsored by the IHSA, and were crowned champions.
 Debate:  1974-75
 Drama: 1984–85, 1988–89, 1990–91, 1993–94, 1996–97, 2018–19
 Group Interpretation: 1980–81, 1982–83, 1996–97
 Individual Events: 1987–88, 1992–93

Notable alumni

 Jim Ard was an NBA player and member of the 1976 NBA Champion Boston Celtics, sixth overall pick of 1970 NBA draft.
 Lloyd Batts was a basketball player for the University of Cincinnati who played one season with the ABA Virginia Squires.
 Michael Boatman is an actor and writer, known for starring roles in the television series Spin City and Arliss.
 Lou Boudreau was a Major League Baseball shortstop and manager, elected to the Baseball Hall Of Fame in 1970. A copy of his Hall of Fame plaque hangs in Thornton's "Boudreau Room". He also led Thornton's basketball team to three state championships in the 1930s.
 Steve Coutchie quarterbacked the undefeated national champion 1923 Illinois Fighting Illini football team.
 The Dells is a primarily R & B musical group formed in 1952 that was inducted in the Rock and Roll Hall of Fame in 2004 and known for the song "Oh, What a Night".
 Suzzanne Douglas – actress 
 Tom Dreesen is a comedian, entertainer and public speaker, best remembered for his appearances on The Tonight Show Starring Johnny Carson and Late Show With David Letterman, and as an opening act for Frank Sinatra.
 Melvin Ely was a professional basketball player who played for the NBA's New Orleans Pelicans.
 Mustapha Farrakhan Jr. is a professional basketball player who played for the University of Virginia and is a member of Nation of Islam.
 Lupe Fiasco (Wasalu Muhammad Jaco) is a Grammy Award-winning rapper.
 Terry Fox (class of 1953) was an MLB pitcher (1960-66) for the Milwaukee Braves and Detroit Tigers.
 Barry Gardner was an NFL linebacker (1999–2005), and member of the Philadelphia Eagles team that appeared in Super Bowl XXXIX.
 Jack Golden is an NFL linebacker who was a member of two teams which appeared in the Super Bowl; the 2000 New York Giants and 2002 Tampa Bay Buccaneers.
 Napoleon Harris was an NFL linebacker (2002–2009)  for the Minnesota Vikings and later a member of the Illinois Senate.
 LaRoyce Hawkins (class of 2006), spoken word artist, stand-up comic and actor, starring on NBC's Chicago P.D..
 Bill Hayes is an actor and singer, best remembered for his role in the soap opera Days of Our Lives.
 Rod Higgins played in the NBA for 13 years before becoming an executive with the Charlotte Bobcats.
Marvin Jones (born 1993) is a basketball player in the Israeli Basketball Premier League
 Norman J. Kansfield, president of New Brunswick Theological Seminary, 1993–2005.
 Lamar McGriggs (class of 1986) played linebacker for the New York Giants and in the Canadian Football League.
 Antwaan Randle El was an NFL wide receiver for the Pittsburgh Steelers and Washington Redskins who played for the Steelers' championship team in Super Bowl XL; currently a television sports commentator
 Don Robertson is a former MLB outfielder (Chicago Cubs)
 Betty Robinson (class of 1929) is a two–time Olympic gold medalist; she won the first gold medal in the women's 100 meter dash at the 1928 Summer Olympics. She held the world record in the 100 meters for 4 years. Her Olympic gold medal is housed at the school.
 Dandrell Scott is a rapper and voiceover actor for Wendy's.
 Shelby Steele is an author, columnist and filmmaker.
 Dick Steere was a guard in the National Football League.
 Tai Streets is a former NFL wide receiver (1999–2004) who played for the University of Michigan's 1997 national championship team.
 John Sullivan played shortstop for the Washington Senators and St. Louis Browns in six Major League Baseball seasons during the 1940s.
 Willie Taylor- singer
 Danitra Vance was an Obie Award–winning actress, perhaps best known for her time performing on Saturday Night Live, where she was the first African-American woman to be a regular cast member.
 Melvin Van Peebles is a director, producer, actor and writer (Sweet Sweetback's Baadasssss Song'').
 Tracy Webster (class of 1991) is a basketball assistant coach at the University of California at Berkeley who was interim head coach for DePaul in 2010.
 Steven Whitehurst is an author, poet, essayist and educator.

References

External links
Thornton Township High school

Educational institutions established in 1899
Harvey, Illinois
Public high schools in Cook County, Illinois
1899 establishments in Illinois